Law enforcement in Slovakia is divided among various agencies under the Slovak ministries of Interior, Justice, Traffic, Defense, Finance and local governments within the Republic. The Slovak Secret Service (Slovenská informačná služba), one out of four secret services in the country, also lists among its tasks those usually reserved for the police force, for example fighting against organized crime and computer crime, Slovakia also features voluntary police without any extra rights.

Civil policing responsibilities are shared between the state and local level: in addition to the Slovak police Force (Policajný zbor Slovenskej republiky), various municipal police forces exist. Other forces include the military police, railway police, finance police, various special forces units divided between numerous ministries and others. As of 2012, there were 21,407 state policemen serving in Slovakia, with 2,500 municipal policemen and 750 voluntary citizens, which is three times the number of policemen in the comparatively similar Finland.

History
In 2010, the Slovak police established for the first time plans for different criminal areas. In October 2011, police President Jaroslav Spišiak and Minister of Interior Daniel Lipšic announced that Slovak police are satisfied with the plans at 104.93%.

Structure
 Secret services
 Slovenská informačná služba
 Vojenská spravodajská služba
 Vojenské obranné spravodajstvo
 Národný bezpečnostný úrad
 Police Force
 Traffic Police
 Railway Police
 Riot Railway Police
 Financial Police
 Riot Police
 Police Emergency Units of Riot Police departments of the Regional Police Headquarters of the Police Force
 Special protection department of the Office for protection of state officials and diplomatic missions
 Criminal Police
 Border and Foreigner Police
 Toll Police
 Slovak Armed Forces
 Military Police
 Riot Military Police
 5th Regiment of special assignment of Jozef Gabčík in Žilina
 Special Operations Unit - Lynx Commando
 Prison and Court Police
 Engagement Unit of the Prison and Court Police Corps
 Customs Police
 Service Engagement Unit of the Customs Criminal Office of the Slovak Customs Administration
 Municipal Police
 various Municipal Police forces in different cities
 Slovakia Drug Agency

Railway police

In 1918 the new Czechoslovak railways established its own security infrastructure, which at that time served only as a backup force for the regular police. Armed men protecting the railways were established in 1935, their functioning was regulated by the Law No. 86/1937 Zb from the year 1937, which also established the Armed guards units of the railways. Later, in the 1950s, Public Security at the Railways was created. Law No. 51/1964 Zb. established the Units of Armed and Fire protection of the Railways in 1964. In 1967, under the OPOŽ units, an independent investigation service was established by Law No. 46/1967 Zb. After the fall of communism in 1989, federal power ceased over the protection of the railway system in 1992. Law No. 61/1993 Z. z from the year 1993 created a separate Slovak Railway Police by transforming part of the Federal Railway Police.

In 1998 the National Council of the Slovak Republic approved Law No. 57/1998 Z.z. by which the Railway Police was governed and the service employment within the Railway Police was described in Law No. 73/1998 Z.z. On 14 February 2008 the former law was amended with Law No. 86/2008 Z. z., this change established the structures of the Toll Police within the Railway Police. In 2010, the National Council of the Slovak Republic amended the Railway Police Law again by approving Law No. 60/2010 Z. z., moving the structures of the Toll Police within the Slovak Police Force.

Previously administered by the Ministry of Transport, Post and Telecommunications, since 2009 the Railway Police is administered by the Ministry of Interior. Since 1 January 2011, in accordance with law approved on 10 December 2010, a new service "Railway Police" was created within the Police Force and the Railway Police was moved under the Police Force, all eligible former members becoming members of the Police Force. Some of the unique Railway Police competences were absorbed by the Police Force as well.

The following competences were added to each member of the Police Force since 1 January 2011:
 control over the railway traffic
 investigating railway traffic threats
 cooperating with others in the safe transfer of nuclear and other special materials
Current uniforms and badges are valid until the end of 2015.

Special forces
Slovakia features numerous special forces units, universally referred to as kukláči (the word kukla means 'balaclava' in Slovak) by the Slovak media and the public. In communist Czechoslovakia the URN units were responsible for counter-terrorism and apprehending dangerous criminals. URN members were picked from across the country. After the creation of independent Slovakia in 1993, Slovak members of URN were relocated into newly created special forces in Slovakia.

 Ministry of Interior
 Special Operations Unit of the Presidium of the Police Force - Lynx Commando
 Police Emergency Units of Riot Police departments of the Regional Police Headquarters of the Police Force
 Special protection department of the Office for protection of state officials and diplomatic missions
 Engagement group of the Office for combating organized crime of the Presidium of the Police Force
 Engagement and Training Unit of the Mobile engagement unit of the Police Force in Sobrance
 Ministry of Finance
 Service Mission Unit of the Customs Criminal Office of the Slovak Customs Administration
 Ministry of Justice
 Engagement Unit of the Prison and Court Police Corps
 Ministry of Defense
 5th Special Forces Regiment of Jozef Gabčík in Žilina

See also

 Crime in Slovakia
 Life imprisonment in Slovakia

References

External links
  Slovak Ministry of Interior - information about law enforcement in Slovakia (in Slovak)